Păușești is a commune located in Vâlcea County, Oltenia, Romania. It is composed of three villages: Buzdugan, Păușești, and Păușești-Otăsău.

It is traversed north to south by the river Otăsău. Păușești borders  Pietrari and Stoenești communes to the north, Frâncești commune to the south, Băile Govora to the east, and Tomșani commune to the west.

The Brădești and Văleni oil fields are located on the territory of the commune.

Natives
 Daniel Chițoiu (born 1967), economist who served as Finance Minister in 2012–2014.

References

Communes in Vâlcea County
Localities in Oltenia